The English Patient is a 1996 epic romantic war drama film directed by Anthony Minghella from his own script based on the 1992 novel of the same name by Michael Ondaatje and produced by Saul Zaentz.

The eponymous protagonist, a man burned beyond recognition who speaks with an English accent, recalls his history in a series of flashbacks, revealing to the audience his true identity and the love affair he was involved in before the war. He does not admit his identity or reveal the entire story to the nurse who cares for him and the man who suspects him until the end of the film. This form of exposition is very different from the book, where, under the influence of morphine, the patient talks about his past. The film ends with a definitive onscreen statement that it is a highly fictionalized account of László Almásy (died 1951) and other historical figures and events.

The film received twelve nominations at the 69th Academy Awards, winning nine, including Best Picture, Best Director for Minghella, and Best Supporting Actress for Juliette Binoche. It was also the first to receive a Best Editing Oscar for a digitally edited film. Ralph Fiennes, playing the titular character, and Kristin Scott Thomas were Oscar-nominated for their performances. The film also won five BAFTA Awards and two Golden Globes. The British Film Institute ranked The English Patient the 55th greatest British film of the 20th century. The American Film Institute ranked it the 56th greatest love story of all-time.

As of August 2021, the novel was in early development for a new BBC television series, co-produced by Miramax Television and Paramount Television Studios.

Plot
An interwar vintage British biplane, flying across a sea of desert, is shot down by German gunners. The badly burned pilot is pulled from the wreckage and rescued by a group of Bedouin.

Hana, a French-Canadian combat nurse of the Royal Canadian Army Medical Corps during WWII, learns from a wounded soldier that her boyfriend has been killed in action.

In October 1944 Italy, Hana is caring for a dying, scarred-from-burns English-accented patient who says he cannot remember his name. His only possession is a copy of Herodotus' Histories, with personal notes, pictures, and mementos stored inside. When a nurse friend is killed in front of her, Hana decides she is a curse to those who love her. She gains permission to settle in a bombed-out monastery with her patient, as he suffers extra during relocations of her hospital unit.

They are soon joined by Lt. Kip, a Sikh sapper in the British Indian Army posted with Sgt. Hardy to clear German mines and booby traps. David Caravaggio, a Canadian Intelligence Corps operative who was tortured during a German interrogation, also arrives at the monastery. Caravaggio questions the patient, who gradually reveals his past through a series of flashbacks. Over the days of the patient relating his story, Hana and Kip begin a shy love affair.

The patient reveals that in the late 1930s he was exploring a region of the Sahara. He is, in fact, Hungarian cartographer László Almásy, who was part of a Royal Geographical Society archeological and surveying expedition with a group including his good friend, Englishman Peter Madox, and British couple Geoffrey and Katharine Clifton, who own a plane and contribute with aerial surveys.

Almásy learns information from a Bedouin which helps the group discover the Cave of Swimmers, an ancient site of cave paintings. The group begins to document their find, during which time Almásy and Katharine fall in love. He writes about her in notes folded into his book, which Katharine discovers when Almásy awkwardly accepts her offer of two watercolours she has painted of the cave imagery and asks her to paste them into the book.

The two begin an affair on their return to Cairo, while the group arranges for more detailed archaeological surveys of the cave and the surrounding area. Almásy buys her a silver thimble as a gift. Some months later, Katharine abruptly ends their affair from fear Geoffrey will discover it. Shortly afterward the archaeological projects are halted due to the onset of the war. Madox leaves his Tiger Moth aeroplane at Kufra Oasis before his intended return to Britain.

Caravaggio reveals that he has been seeking revenge for his injuries, and has killed the German interrogator who cut off his thumbs and the spy who identified him, but has been searching for the man who provided maps to the Germans, allowing them to infiltrate Cairo. He suspects the patient is Almásy, asking "Did you kill the Cliftons?", to which Almásy concedes "Maybe... I did".

Reminiscing for Caravaggio, with Hana listening in from an adjoining room, Almásy recalls packing camp in 1941 when Geoffrey arrives overhead. He dives straight for Almásy, who jumps out of the way. Scrambling over to the wreckage, he finds Geoffrey dead at the controls and Katharine badly injured in the front seat. She tells him Geoffrey knew, and was attempting a double murder-suicide. Almásy carries her to the Cave of Swimmers. He notices she is wearing a chain bearing his gift, and she declares she has always loved him.

Leaving her in the cave with provisions and his book, Almásy walks three days cross-desert. Arriving at British-held El Tag, he explains the desperate situation and asks for help, but a young officer detains Almásy on suspicion of being a spy. Transported away by train, Almásy escapes and eventually comes into contact with a German army unit. They take him to the Kufra Oasis, where Madox has hidden his plane. Exchanging maps for fuel, Almásy takes to the air and finally reaches the cave, where he confirms that Katharine has died. He carries her body to the plane, and he is burned when shot down, connecting to the start of the film. After hearing the story, Caravaggio gives up his quest for revenge.

Kip is reposted once he has cleared the area of explosives; he and Hana agree they will meet again. Later, pushing several vials of morphine toward Hana, Almásy tells her he has had enough. Though visibly upset, she grants his wish and administers a lethal dose. As he drifts to sleep, she reads him Katharine's final letter, written to Almásy while she was alone in the cave. The next morning Caravaggio returns with a friend, and they get a lift to Florence. Hana holds Almásy's book tightly as they ride away.

Cast

In addition, Torri Higginson plays Mary and Liisa Repo-Martell plays Jan, appearing briefly as Hana's nursing corps colleagues.

Production

Saul Zaentz was interested in working with Anthony Minghella after he saw the director's film Truly, Madly, Deeply (1990); Minghella brought this project to the producer's attention. Michael Ondaatje, the Sri Lankan-born Canadian author of the novel, worked closely with the filmmakers. According to Minghella, during the development of the project with 20th Century Fox, the "studio wanted the insurance policy of so-called bigger" actors. Zaentz recalled, "they'd look at you and say, 'Could we cast Demi Moore in the role'?" After Miramax Films took over production duties, the director's preference for Scott Thomas in the role of Katharine was honored.

The film was shot on location in Tunisia and Italy and had a production budget of $31 million.

The Conversations: Walter Murch and the Art of Editing Film by Michael Ondaatje is based on the conversations between the author and film editor. Murch, with a career that already included such complex works as the Godfather trilogy, The Conversation, and Apocalypse Now, dreaded the task of editing the film with multiple flashbacks and time frames. Once he began, the possibilities became apparent, some of which took him away from the order of the original script. A reel without sound was made so scene change visuals would be consistent with the quality of the aural aspect between the two. The final cut features over 40 temporal transitions. It was during this time that Murch met Ondaatje and they were able to exchange thoughts about editing the film.

In the film, two types of aircraft were used: a De Havilland D.H.82 Tiger Moth and a Boeing-Stearman Model 75. Both are biplanes. The camp crash scene was made with a -size scale model.

The Hungarian folk song, "Szerelem, Szerelem", performed by Muzsikas featuring Márta Sebestyén, was featured in the film.

Reception
The film received widespread critical acclaim, was a box office success, and received nine Academy Awards, six BAFTA awards, and two Golden Globe Awards.

Janet Maslin of The New York Times called the movie "a stunning feat of literary adaptation as well as a purely cinematic triumph". In The New Yorker, Anthony Lane argues that "the triumph of the film lies not just in the force and the range of the performances—the crisp sweetness of Scott Thomas, say, versus the raw volatility of Binoche—but in Minghella’s creation of an intimate epic: vast landscapes mingle with the minute details of desire, and the combination is transfixing".

The film has a "Certified Fresh" rating of 86% on Rotten Tomatoes based on 91 reviews, with an average rating of 7.90/10. The website's critical consensus states, "Though it suffers from excessive length and ambition, director Minghella's adaptation of the Michael Ondaatje novel is complex, powerful, and moving." The film also has a rating of 87/100 on Metacritic, based on 31 critical reviews, indicating "universal acclaim". Chicago Sun Times critic Roger Ebert gave the film a four-star rating, saying "it's the kind of movie you can see twice – first for the questions, the second time for the answers". In his movie guide, Leonard Maltin rated the film  out of 4, calling it "a mesmerizing adaptation" of Ondaatje's novel, saying "Fiennes and Scott Thomas are perfectly matched", and he concluded by calling the film "an exceptional achievement all around". In 2021, The Boston Globe called the movie a "masterpiece" in a 25-year anniversary review.

Audiences surveyed by CinemaScore gave the film a grade of "A−" on a scale of A+ to F.

It became the highest-grossing film in the history of Miramax with a worldwide gross of $232 million.

Accolades

Lists

In 2009, The English Patient was included in The Guardian's 25 best British films of the last 25 years list.

Soundtrack

See also
 BFI Top 100 British films
 The English Patient (Seinfeld)

Notes

References

Further reading

External links

 
 
 
 
 Laszlo Almásy: the real English patient

1996 films
1996 romantic drama films
1990s war drama films
British historical drama films
American war drama films
American historical romance films
American romantic drama films
1990s English-language films
1990s German-language films
1990s Italian-language films
Arabic-language films
Films directed by Anthony Minghella
BAFTA winners (films)
Best Drama Picture Golden Globe winners
Films that won the Best Original Score Academy Award
Best Picture Academy Award winners
Films based on Canadian novels
Films featuring a Best Supporting Actress Academy Award-winning performance
Films set in the British Empire
Films set in Egypt
Films set in Libya
Films set in deserts
Films with atheism-related themes
Films set in Italy
Films set in the 1930s
Films set in the 1940s
Films shot in Rome
Films shot in Tunisia
Films that won the Best Costume Design Academy Award
Films that won the Best Sound Mixing Academy Award
Films whose art director won the Best Art Direction Academy Award
Films whose cinematographer won the Best Cinematography Academy Award
Films whose director won the Best Directing Academy Award
Films whose editor won the Best Film Editing Academy Award
War romance films
American World War II films
British World War II films
Miramax films
Films scored by Gabriel Yared
Films produced by Saul Zaentz
Best Film BAFTA Award winners
Films whose writer won the Best Adapted Screenplay BAFTA Award
Films about nurses
Burn survivors in fiction
Films set in country houses
Italian Campaign of World War II films
North African campaign films
1990s American films
1990s British films
Films about disability